Thuật hoài (literally: Express) is one of two poems which are still exist of Phạm Ngũ Lão (1255-1320), a famous general of Trần dynasty.

Introduction
This is a seven-word four-line poem (Vietnamese: thất ngôn tứ tuyệt) written by Hán word. Its composition time is not known.
 Han word version
 橫槊江山恰幾秋
 三軍貔虎氣吞牛
 男兒未了功名債
 羞聽人間說武侯
 Hán-Việt Spelling:
 Thuật hoài
 Hoành sóc giang sơn kháp kỷ thu,
 Tam quân tì hổ khí thôn ngưu.
 Nam nhi vị liễu công danh trái,
 Tu thính nhân gian thuyết Vũ hầu.

 Translation:
 Express
 Kept the spear transversely in homeland for many years,
 Three Squad is as tough as tiger and leopard, Ch'i is strong enough to gulp a buffalo (or Ch'i is so strong that can overwhelm Taurus constellation).
 As a man who did not pay honor doubt,
 Then he will be ashamed to hear about Zhuge.

Notes

Vietnamese poems